Montluçon Football is a football club located in Montluçon, France. They compete in the Championnat National 3, the fifth tier of French football.

The club was formerly known as Étoile des Sports Montluçonnais Football from 1934 to 2011 before dissolving due to financial issues. It was reformed in 2011 as Ilets Étoile Football Montluçon before taking its current name of Montluçon Football in 2014.

Honours
 Division d'Honneur Auvergne: 1946–47, 1949–50, 1958–59, 2013–14
 Championnat de France Amateur Group Southwest: 1967–68
Division 3 Group Centre: 1977–78
Promotion d'Honneur Auvergne: 2012–13
Coupe d'Allier: 2016–17

Season to season

Association football clubs established in 1934
1934 establishments in France
Association football clubs disestablished in 2011
2011 disestablishments in France
Montluçon
Sport in Allier
Football clubs in Auvergne-Rhône-Alpes